Big Picture High School may refer to:

Big Picture High School in Bloomfield, Connecticut
Big Picture High School in St. Louis, Missouri
Big Picture High School in LaFayette, New York
Big Picture High School in Nashville, Tennessee
Big Picture High School in South Burlington, Vermont
Big Picture High School in Tulsa, Oklahoma
Big Picture High School in Bloomfield, Connecticut
Big Picture High School in Durango, Colorado
Highline Big Picture School in Burien, Washington
Bellevue Big Picture School in Bellevue, Washington
Big Picture Middle and High School in Fresno, California
Big Picture Academy at Northwest in St. Louis, Missouri